Barthea is a genus of flowering plants belonging to the family Melastomataceae.

Its native range is Vietnam, Southeastern China and Taiwan.

Species:

Barthea barthei

References

Melastomataceae
Melastomataceae genera